The Pope's Creek Subdivision is a CSX Transportation railroad line in Maryland, running from Bowie to Morgantown where the Morgantown Generating Station is located and the Chalk Point Generating Station.

History 
The Pope's Creek Subdivision was originally built by the Baltimore and Potomac Railroad. The company was organized on December 19, 1858, and began surveying the route May 3, 1859. Construction started in 1861 but progressed slowly until 1867, when the Pennsylvania Railroad (PRR) and its ally, the Northern Central Railway (NCRY), bought the company. The PRR at the time had access to Baltimore via its own lines: the NCRY from the north and the Philadelphia, Wilmington and Baltimore Railroad from the northeast. However, it used the Baltimore and Ohio Railroad (B&O) and its Washington Branch to continue southwest to Washington, D.C. The PRR and B&O were rivals, and the Maryland General Assembly refused to grant a charter to end the B&O's monopoly on Baltimore-Washington travel. However, the existing Baltimore and Potomac charter allowed exactly that, via the clause that allowed branches; all the PRR had to do was to take the line within 20 miles (32 km) of Washington. The PRR obtained a charter for the section in Washington on February 5, 1867.

Thus the new Baltimore-Washington line opened on July 2, 1872, and the required "main line" to Pope's Creek on the Potomac River, immediately relegated to branch status, opened on January 1, 1873. 

Passenger service from Bowie to Pope's Creek ended on October 29, 1949.

Ownership of the line passed from the PRR to the Penn Central Transportation Company in 1968 and to Conrail in 1976. When Conrail was split in 1999, CSX Transportation was assigned the line.

Current operation 

The Pope's Creek Subdivision currently runs from its interchange at Bowie with Amtrak's Northeast Corridor main line, to the Morgantown and Chalk Point Generating Stations. A wye track exists to allow trains to enter Amtrak's main line and go north or south, so that a second engine or cab car is not needed. Amtrak limits these trains to late night/very early morning runs and no more than 160 cars. The line is mostly single tracked, with long sidings in Collington, Upper Marlboro and Brandywine. At Brandywine the Herbert Subdivision branches off, carrying a single track to the GenOn Chalk Point Power Station. If the train continues straight through Brandywine, it will reach the Morgantown Generating Station. This line currently hosts 2 to 3 trains a day (a down-and-back coal train and an occasional local freight train serving a few businesses in the Waldorf and La Plata area).

The Navy spur that branched off at White Plains (between Waldorf and La Plata) going over to Indian Head, was in service from 1918 into the 1960s. After decades of non-use and efforts to start a tourist railroad, the spur was converted to a rail trail in 2008.

Future conversion possibility
The Maryland Transit Administration conducted a study in 2009 to evaluate the feasibility of MARC Train passenger service on this line.

See also
List of CSX Transportation lines

References

CSX Transportation lines
Philadelphia, Baltimore and Washington Railroad lines
Rail infrastructure in Maryland
Transportation in Prince George's County, Maryland